Ali Ghribi is a Paralympic athlete from Tunisia competing mainly in category P58 pentathlon events.

He competed in the 2000 Summer Paralympics in Sydney, Australia.  There he won a gold medal in the men's Pentathlon - P58 event.  He also competed at the 2004 Summer Paralympics in Athens, Greece.  , finished eighth in the men's Discus throw - F58 event, finished seventh in the men's Javelin throw - F58 event and finished fourth in the men's Pentathlon - P54-58 event

External links
 

Year of birth missing (living people)
Living people
Paralympic athletes of Tunisia
Athletes (track and field) at the 2000 Summer Paralympics
Athletes (track and field) at the 2004 Summer Paralympics
Paralympic gold medalists for Tunisia
Medalists at the 2000 Summer Paralympics
Tunisian male javelin throwers
Tunisian male discus throwers
Paralympic medalists in athletics (track and field)
20th-century Tunisian people
21st-century Tunisian people
Wheelchair javelin throwers
Wheelchair discus throwers
Paralympic javelin throwers
Paralympic discus throwers